Alejandro Strachan is a scientist in the field of computational materials and a professor of materials engineering at Purdue University. Before joining Purdue University, he was a staff member at Los Alamos National Laboratory.

Education 
Strachan studied physics at the University of Buenos Aires, Argentina. He received his master's of science there in 1995, followed by his PhD in 1998. He then moved to Caltech, first as a postdoctoral scholar and then as a research scientist until 2002.

Research and career 
Strachan became a staff scientist in the Theoretical Division of Los Alamos National Laboratory in 2002, staying until becoming a faculty member at Purdue in 2005. He became a full professor in 2013.

Strachan's research focuses on the development of predictive atomistic and molecular simulation methodologies to describe materials, primarily density functional theory and molecular dynamics. With these methods he studies problems of technological importance including coupled electronic, thermal, and mechanical processes in nano-electronics, MEMS and energy conversion devices; thermo-mechanical response and chemistry of polymers, polymer composites, and molecular solids; as well as active materials including shape-memory alloys and high-energy density materials. He also actively focuses on uncertainty quantification across the field of materials modelling.

He previously served as the Deputy Director of the NNSA Center for the Prediction of Reliability, Integrity and Survivability of Microsystems (PRISM). He is currently co-principal investigator for the Network for Computational Nanotechnology (NCN) and nanoHUB (with principal investigator Gerhard Klimeck) and co-leads the Center for Predictive Material and Devices (c-PRIMED), also with Klimeck.

Strachan is also active in education, particularly through nanoHUB, including the fully open and online course "From Atoms to Materials: Predictive Theories and Simulations".

Awards 
 Purdue University Teaching for Tomorrow award, 2007.
 The Minerals, Metals and Materials Society Early Career Faculty Fellow Award 2009.
 Purdue University College of Engineering Faculty Excellence Award. Team Award: PRISM, 2009.
 Purdue University Faculty Scholar (2012-2017)

Selected publications and editorials
 Development of a ReaxFF reactive interatomic potential for energetic materials and study of shock behavior 
 Prediction of polymer properties from molecular dynamics
 Exploration of atomic-level mechanisms in nanoscale memory devices 
 Guest editor with Gerhard Klimeck and Mark Lundstrom of Special Issue in Computing in Science and Engineering on "Cyber-enabled simulations in nanoscale science and engineering" March/April 2010.
 Guest editor with Stephen Foiles and David McDowell in Modelling and Simulation in Materials Science and Engineering for the Focus Issue on Uncertainty Quantification in Materials Modelling" October 2019.

References

External links 
From Atoms to Materials: Predictive Theories and Simulations
School of Materials Engineering Faculty Profile

Purdue University faculty
Engineering educators
Materials scientists and engineers
Year of birth missing (living people)
Living people